Batemannia is a genus of flowering plants from the orchid family, Orchidaceae. 

It contains 5 species, native to Trinidad and South America:

Batemannia armillata Rchb.f - Suriname, Colombia, Ecuador, Peru
Batemannia colleyi Lindl. - Trinidad, French Guinea, Suriname, Guyana, Venezuela, Colombia, Ecuador, Peru, Bolivia, Brazil
Batemannia leferenzii Senghas - Bolivia
Batemannia lepida Rchb.f. - Suriname, Venezuela, Brazil
Batemannia wolteriana Schltr. - Peru

See also 
 List of Orchidaceae genera

References

External links 

Flora of Trinidad and Tobago
Orchids of South America
Zygopetalinae genera
Zygopetalinae